The 2015–16 Hong Kong Second Division League is the 2nd season of Hong Kong Second Division League since it became the third-tier football league in Hong Kong in 2014–15.

The league started on 13 September 2015 and ended on 8 May 2016.

Teams

Changes from last season

From Second Division League
Promoted to First Division League
 Wing Yee

Relegated to Third Division League
 New Fair Kui Tan

Withdrew from league
 Fire Services

To Second Division League
Relegated from First Division League
 Happy Valley
 Tuen Mun

Promoted from Third Division League
 Tung Sing

League table

Results

References

Hong Kong Second Division League seasons